Gorry is a surname. Notable people with the surname include:

Charles Gorry (1878–1950), Australian cricketer
G. Anthony Gorry, American computer scientist
Katrina Gorry (born 1992), Australian women's soccer player
Patrick Gorry (1896–1965), Irish politician

See also
Lénaëlle Gilleron-Gorry (born 1995), French figure skater
McGorry
Gorries (disambiguation)

Manx-language surnames